Abū Muḥammad ʿAbd al-Jamīl bin ʿAbd al-Ḥaqq bin ʿAbd al-Waḥīd bin Muḥammad bin al-Hāshim bin Bilāl al-Hāshimī al-ʿUmarī al-ʿAdawī, better known as Abū Turāb al-Ẓāhirī (1 January 1923 – 4 May 2002), was an Indian-born Saudi Arabian linguist, jurist, theologian and journalist. he was often referred to as the Sibawayh of his era due to his knowledge of the Arabic language.

Life
Zahiri was born in 1923 in what was then the British Raj, to a family of Arab descent. Through their family tree, Zahiri's parents could trace their original roots back to Umar, the second caliph of Islam and of the Rashidun Caliphate, and thus the Banu Adi clan of the Quraysh tribe.

Zahiri traveled extensively in pursuit of Islamic manuscripts, which he often copied by hand due to lack of resources. During his younger years, he visited Western Europe, North Africa and the Middle East. He eventually ended up in Egypt, where he earned his master's and doctoral degrees at Al-Azhar University, and was also a student of fellow Hadith specialist Ahmad Muhammad Shakir. Later, Zahiri settled down in Saudi Arabia in 1948 at the behest of first King of Saudi Arabia Ibn Saud, who requested that Zahiri teach Muslim theology in Mecca's Masjid al-Haram, the holiest site in Islam. Zahiri's best known student was Abu Abd al-Rahman Ibn Aqil al-Zahiri, who shared Zahiri's pen name due to their adherence to the Zahirite school of Islamic law. Zahiri also had a friendship with fellow foreigner in Saudi Arabia, Abdallah Bin Bayyah.

Zahiri died on Saturday morning, the 21st of Safar in 1423 Hijri, corresponding to 4 May 2002 Gregorian. While in his private library, Zahiri complained of paralysis in his feet to an aide. Prevented from pronouncing the Muslim testimony of faith due to aphasia, Zahiri died on his bed pointing toward the sky instead. He was buried in Mecca's historic Jannatul Mualla cemetery the next morning.

Works
Zahiri authored roughly fifty published works. Although he was fluent in Persian and Urdu and conversational in multiple Languages of India, most of his written work was in Arabic.

Biographical
 ʻAbd al-Karīm ibn ʻAbd Allāh ʻAbd al-Karīm, Abū Turāb al-Ẓāhirī, 1343–1423 H/1923-2002 M : ṣafaḥāt min ḥayātih-- wa-taʼammulāt fī adabih. Riyadh: Maktabat al-Malik Fahd al-Waṭanīyah, 2008. 603 pgs.; 24 cm. 
 ʻAlawī Ṭāhā Ṣāfī, Abū Turāb al-Ẓāhirī-- al-ʻālim al-mawsūʻah-- aw Sībawayh al-aṣr. Riyadh: al-Majallah al-ʻArabīyah, 2003. 32 pgs.; 20 cm. OCLC No. 424454353

Original
 Detik-detik kepergian Rasulullah. Jakarta: Pustaka Azzam, 2001. 328 p. ; 23 cm. Translated by Wawan Djunaedi Soffandi.
 Lijam al-aqlam. Maktabat al-Tihama, 1982. 276 pgs.

References

External links
 Abu Turab's Obituary from Al Riyadh (Arabic)
 Biography of Abu Turab at the official website of Umm al-Qura University (Arabic)

1923 births
2002 deaths
Indian expatriates in Egypt
Indian emigrants to Saudi Arabia
Hadith scholars
Jurisprudence academics
Literary critics of Arabic
20th-century Muslim scholars of Islam
20th-century Saudi Arabian poets
Saudi Arabian Sunni Muslim scholars of Islam
Sunni fiqh scholars
Al-Azhar University alumni
Zahiris
Burials at Jannat al-Mu'alla